Frederick Hugh Wright Crabb was an Anglican bishop in the 20th century.

Born in Luppitt, Devon on 24 April 1915, he was educated at the University of London and ordained in 1939. His first posts were curacies in Teignmouth and Plymouth after which he was a missionary in Sudan until 1951. He was Vice Principal of the  London College of Divinity from 1951 until 1957 and then Principal of the College of Emmanuel and St Chad, Saskatoon for a further 10 years. He then held two incumbencies in Calgary before being appointed Bishop of Athabasca in 1975. He was also Metropolitan  of Rupert's Land from 1977 and retired in 1982.

Crabb died on 24 February 2007.

References

1915 births
People from East Devon District
Alumni of the University of London
Anglican bishops of Athabasca
20th-century Anglican Church of Canada bishops
Metropolitans of Rupert's Land
20th-century Anglican archbishops
2007 deaths
English Anglican missionaries
Anglican missionaries in Sudan
Clergy from Devon